A Sunday Morning in the South is a 1925 play about lynching written by Georgia Douglas Johnson.

Characters 
 Sue Jones: grandmother, aged seventy
 Tom Griggs, Jones' grandson, aged nineteen
 Bossie Griggs, Jones' grandson, aged seven
 Liza Griggs, a friend, aged sixty
 Matilda Brown, a friend, aged fifty
 White Girl
 First Officer
 Second Officer

Plot 
A Sunday Morning in the South is set in the kitchen of Sue Jones' two-room house in a small town in the South in 1924. The play opens with Sue making breakfast for her grandson Tom: she makes light rolls and sausage. Tom takes a long time to get out of bed, and Sue says: "It’s as hard to git yawll out of the bed on Sunday morning as it is to pull hen’s teeth." They discuss the events of the previous night, saying that the police are trying to catch a black man who supposedly attacked and possibly raped a white woman near the market. They say that white people are in blackface and they could have done it; also, that they only see color and could possibly arrest the wrong man.

Songs 
The show is set next to a church, so, throughout the show, there is gospel music heard that interrupts the dialogue. The songs include:

 Let Your Light Shine on Me
 Alas! did my Savior Bleed
 I Must Tell Jesus

References 
 Stephens, Judith L. "Art, Activism, and Uncompromising Attitude in Georgia Douglas Johnson's Lynching Plays." African American Review 39.1/2 (2005): 87–102. Web.
 Henderson, Dorothy Faye. "Georgia Douglas Johnson: A Study of Her Life and Literature." ProQuest Dissertations Publishing, 1995. Web
 Perkins, Kathy A., 1954. Black Female Playwrights: An Anthology of Plays before 1950. Bloomington: Indiana University Press, 1989. Web
 Donlon, Jocelyn Hazelwood. "Georgia Douglas Johnson", Black Women in America: An Historical Encyclopedia. No. 1. Ed. Darlene Clark Hines. Brooklyn: Carolson, 1993.
 Stephens, Judith L. "Politics and Aesthetics, Race and Gender: Georgia Douglas Johnson's Lynching Dramas as Black Feminist Cultural Performance."Text and Performance Quarterly20.3 (2000): 251. Web.

American plays
Fiction set in 1924
1925 plays
Works by Georgia Douglas Johnson